Maksym Prykhodnoy (Maksim Prikhodnoy (born 27 October 1992) is a professional Ukraine-born Russian football midfielder who plays for FC Krymteplytsia Molodizhne. He acquired Russian citizenship in 2014.

Career
Prykhodnoy was born in the family of amateur footballer Serhiy Prykhodonoy, who played in FC Lokomotyv Simferopol. In age 6 years old he became attended the Sportive youth school of SC Tavriya Simferopol. His first trainer was Oleksandr Bilozerskyi.

Prykhodnoy made his debut for SC Tavriya Simferopol played in the main-squad team against FC Zorya Luhansk on 26 May 2013 in Ukrainian Premier League.

References

External links

1992 births
Living people
Sportspeople from Simferopol
Ukrainian people of Russian descent
Naturalised citizens of Russia
Association football midfielders
FC TSK Simferopol players
Ukrainian footballers
Russian footballers
Ukrainian footballers banned from domestic competitions
Ukrainian Premier League players
SC Tavriya Simferopol players
FC Hirnyk-Sport Horishni Plavni players
Crimean Premier League players
FC Krymteplytsia Molodizhne players